Itaguara is a Brazilian municipality in the state of Minas Gerais. Its population in 2020 was 13,435.

Toponym 
Itaguara is a coinage from Tupi–Guarani, meaning "wolf rock", by combining  itá (rock) and guará (Wolf).

See also
 List of municipalities in Minas Gerais

References

Municipalities in Minas Gerais